Akali Kaur Singh Nihang (1886-1953) was a religious preacher and Sikh scholar. He was son of Mahari Singh and Malkaram Kaur of Village Paddhar, Chakar, in Pakistan-administered Kashmir. Kaur Singh studied Sikh scriptural texts, Sanskrit, Braj and Ayurveda under Bava Mahari Singh. In 1904, he became student of Giani Bagh Singh, a well known scholar of Peshawar. He used to take part in Arya Samaj Debates. He turn Nihang and renamed as Kaur singh at Hazoor Sahib, Nanded.

He preached the message of guru during his travels throughout India and Afghanistan.

Works
He worked on alphabetical index of Guru Granth Sahib in 1907, and completed it in 1920. In March 1923, it was published under title Guru Shabad Ratan Prakash/Tuk Tatkara and also worked on an index of Bhai Gurdas's work in 1929. He preached message of Gurus in Chakar and opened chain of schools, set up library and published bullietn called Ashram Samachar. His works include Sri Gur Sobha, Kavi Senapati, Gutka Pramanik Nitnem, Buddhibaridh Hitopadesh Ratnakar(Panchtantra in Gurmukhi), Sukh Sagararihat Gharaa Vaid(Ayurveda), Istri Sankat mochan (Women upliftment).

In 1952, he suffered from a heart attack and died on 23 January 1953.

References

Nihang
Scholars of Sikhism
1886 births
1953 deaths
Indian Sikhs
Sikh missionaries
Indian missionaries